Quietly may refer to:

Quietly, play by Owen McCafferty about a pub bombing in Northern Ireland, 2012
Quietly (album), album by Mouth of the Architect, 2008
"Quietly" (song), single by the Guano Apes